Tecticornia lylei, commonly known as wiry glasswort, is a small shrub with in the family Chenopodiaceae. It occurs in saline clay soils on the beds of and around the perimeter of salt lakes. The erect shrub can grow up to 1 m in height and 1.5 m wide, and has slender branches with very slender branchlets, its articles cylindrical, dull mid-green and about 3 mm long and 2 mm wide. The wiry glasswort flowers between November and June, with tiny flowers less than 3 mm across which fruit when pollinated. Listed as endangered in New South Wales and rare in Victoria and South Australia, T. lylei is threatened by trampling and overgrazing, vegetation clearing and stochastic events.

Distribution and habitat 

Tecticornia lylei is an endangered species in NSW and rare in Victoria, with the numbers especially low in the once plentiful low open-shrubland in the Murray Darling Depression Bioregion. Requiring particularly saline soils to survive, it occurs on saline clay soils on the beds of small salt lakes and around the perimeter of larger salt lakes. T. lylei may also be found in somewhat saline and seasonally waterlogged localities.

Ecology 

Tecticornia lylei provides an important habitat for fauna in saline ecosystems. T. lylei pumps oxygen into the sediment under waterlogged conditions, improving the health of saline aquatic and riparian ecological systems. This provides habitat for fauna in saline ecosystems. Insect activity is also high around T. lylei, suggesting benefit for insect communities in saline environments. T. lylei is highly adapted to saline environments.

Life history traits 

The erect shrub can grow up to 1 m in height and 1.5 m wide and has slender branches with very slender branchlets, its articles cylindrical, dull mid-green and about 3 mm long and 2 mm wide. Tecticornia lylei is leafless with slender branches terminating in spikes, flowers exposed vertical to the spike and less than 3 mm across which when pollinated form fruitlets protruding from the bracts, perianth firm and pithy. Fruiting spikes shedding fruitlets encasing the seed. Seeds are broadly elliptic and measure 1–1.5 mm long; teste crustaceous, reddish-brown, concentrically granular over the embryo.

Cultivation and propagation 

Tecticornia lylei can be grown from tube stock, cutting or by direct seeding. Fruiting segments should be collected from the middle of January to late February . Shoots or whole plants should be harvested by hand or with a forage harvester and spread on the new site. This process is most effective when new site is on lightly cultivated salt affected areas to enable plants to germinate and spread naturally.

Conservation status 

Tecticornia lylei is listed as an endangered species in NSW, and rare in Victoria and South Australia. T. lylei primary threat is from introduced hoofed livestock species such as cattle and sheep, which overgraze and trample the native vegetation. T. lylei is threatened by vegetation clearing to access salt deposits, mineral exploration, and sand mining. Stochastic events such as flooding and drought may bring localised extinction, while limited genetic diversity hinders the species ability to adapt to potential environmental changes.

References 

lylei
Plants described in 2007